Michael or Mike Gibbons may refer to:

 Michael Gibbons (Medal of Honor) (1866–1933), United States Navy sailor and Medal of Honor recipient
 Mike Gibbons (ice hockey) (born 1955), American ice hockey coach
 Michael R. Gibbons (born 1959), American state legislator in Missouri
 Michael Gibbons (boxer) (born 1978), American lightweight boxer
 Michael Gibbons (footballer) (born 1995), Australian footballer
 Michael P. Gibbons, judge in Nevada
 Mick Gibbons (1890–1952), Scottish footballer
 Mike Gibbons (boxer) (1887–1956), American welterweight/middleweight boxer
 Mike Gibbons (American football) (1951–2005), American football player
 Mike Gibbins (1949–2005), English drummer for the band Badfinger, birth name Michael Gibbons
 Mike Gibbons (died 2016), lead vocalist and trumpeter for Bo Donaldson and The Heywoods
 Mike Gibbons (banker), Republican primary candidate in the 2018 United States Senate election in Ohio and 2022 United States Senate election in Ohio
 Michael Gibbons (scientist), social scientist working on knowledge production modes

See also 
 Mike Gibbon (born 1942), English television producer and director